Siloam School is a historic school building located at Eastover, Richland County, South Carolina. It was built about 1936, and is a one-story, two-room building built with funds from the Works Progress Administration (WPA).  It stands on a brick pier foundation and is clad in shiplap weatherboard siding. It operated as a school for African-American children until 1956.

It was added to the National Register of Historic Places in 1996.

References 

African-American history of South Carolina
Works Progress Administration in South Carolina
School buildings on the National Register of Historic Places in South Carolina
School buildings completed in 1936
Buildings and structures in Richland County, South Carolina
National Register of Historic Places in Richland County, South Carolina